Rana Muhammad Hayat Khan (born 24 December 1950) is a Pakistani politician who had been a member of the National Assembly of Pakistan, from June 2013 to May 2018.

Early life 
He was born on 24 December 1950.

Political career

Rana Hayat was elected as a member of National Assembly as a candidate of IJI from constituency NA-108 in Pakistani general election 1990. Rana was re-elected as a member of National Assembly as a candidate of PML-N in Pakistani general election 1997.

He ran for the seat of the National Assembly of Pakistan as an independent candidate from Constituency NA-141 (Kasur-IV) and Constituency NA-142 (Kasur-V) in 2002 Pakistani general election but was unsuccessful. He received 348 votes from Constituency NA-141 (Kasur-IV) and received 43,921 votes from Constituency NA-142 (Kasur-V) and lost both seats to Muhammad Asif Nakai. In the same election, he also ran for the seat of the Provincial Assembly of the Punjab from Constituency PP-183 (Kasur-IX) as an independent candidate but was unsuccessful. He received 19,644 votes and lost the seat to Sardar Pervaiz Hasan Nakai, a candidate of Pakistan Muslim League (Q) (PML-Q). 

He ran for the seat of the National Assembly as a candidate of Pakistan Muslim League (N) (PML-N) from Constituency NA-142 (Kasur-V) in by-election in 2003 but was unsuccessful. He received 46,042 votes and lost the seat to Sardar Talib Hassan Nakai.

He ran for the seat of the National Assembly as a candidate of PML-N from Constituency NA-142 (Kasur-V) in 2008 Pakistani general election but was unsuccessful. He received 19,512 votes and lost the seat to Muhammad Asif Nakai. In the same election, he also ran for the seat of the Provincial Assembly of the Punjab from Constituency PP-183 (Kasur-IX) a candidate of PML-N but was unsuccessful. He received 19,512 votes and lost the seat to Muhammad Asif Nakai.

He was elected to the National Assembly as a candidate of PML-N from Constituency NA-142 (Kasur-V) in 2013 Pakistani general election. He received 85,243 votes and defeated Sardar Talib Hassan Nakai.

He ran for the seat of National Assembly of Pakistan from NA-140 in Pakistani General Election 2018 but was unsuccessful. He was defeated by Sardar Talib Hassan Nakai.

References

Living people
Pakistan Muslim League (N) politicians
Punjabi people
Pakistani MNAs 2013–2018
People from Kasur District
1955 births